"Liar! Liar!" is the twenty-third single by B'z, released on October 8, 1997. This song is one of B'z many number-one singles in Oricon chart, selling 794,000 copies during its chartrun.

"Liar! Liar!" was featured on the PlayStation 2 music video game GuitarFreaks. Marty Friedman, ex-Megadeth guitarist who is acquainted with J-pop, stated that this song is one of his favorites in a column he wrote for the magazine Nikkei Entertainment.

Track listing
All songs composed and arranged by Tak Matsumoto, lyrics written by Koshi Inaba
"Liar! Liar!"
""

Personnel
 Tak Matsumoto - Electric guitar
 Koshi Inaba - Lead vocals
 Akihito Tokunaga - Bass
 Hideo Yamaki - Drums

Certifications

References

External links
B'z official website

1997 singles
B'z songs
Oricon Weekly number-one singles
Songs written by Tak Matsumoto
Songs written by Koshi Inaba